Repparfjorden is a fjord in the municipality of Hammerfest in Troms og Finnmark county, Norway.

As of 2015, the municipal and national authorities have made plans to dump up to two million tons of waste into the fjord annually for fifteen years. The material is waste from planned copper mines that the authorities have approved. Hundreds of youths are on lists of people who are said to be willing to engage in civil disobedience to protest the expected dumping of waste into the fjord.

Fjord and mineral waster dumping 
Northern Europe's mineral sector is expanding, with nations such as Sweden, Finland, and Norway all aiming to graze into a mineral exploration era. Nussir ASA is developing a copper mine in the Repparfjord, located in Finnmark in the far northwestern region of Norway. The mine's tailing will be poured into the fjord over 20 years, totaling 30 million metric tonnes of hazardous mining tailings. Locals and environmental organizations are concerned, and with reason: various marine research institutes, notably the Institute of Marine Studies, had already criticized the proposals as environmentally irresponsible. Nordic Mining intends to establish a magnetite ore mine in Fredfjorden and discharge the toxins into the fjord. Fredfjorden, like Repparfjorden, is designated as a "national salmon fjord" for wild salmon and, as such, should be legally protected. Previous experiences with subsurface tailing deposits harmed ecosystems and the local economy.

Political conflict 
The conflict between Nussir  and the Sámi Parliament, with other stakeholders such as the Norwegian Government's involvement, began in 2014. It is categorized as a mineral ores and building materials extraction conflict within the Kvalsund municipality. The Norwegian Government and Nussir maintain that the mining is sustainable and necessary for environmental advances, yet the Sámi population and other environmental organizations fear destruction of marine and terrestrial environments. The Sámi also claim that the mine will disrupt their traditional lifestyle and destroy the grazing grounds of their reindeer. Reindeer husbandry is the main source of sustenance and income for many Sámi and without it, the consequences will be detrimental to Sámi life and culture. The conflict is of medium intensity, with visible mobilization and street protests present. In 2021, the Sámi camped in tents for two months where the mountain meets the fjord. The camping was an act of civil disobedience and cultural celebration. Other forms of mobilization include blockades, boycotts, and development of NGOs. The conflict is considered to be ongoing.

Ecological conflict 
The ecological conflict is categorized as wetlands and coastal zones management issues. The Repparfjord is classified as a National Salmon Fjord because of its Atlantic salmon spawning grounds. The concern is that the Nussir operation will destroy the ecosystems within the fjord, which many of the locals are heavily dependent on. This conflict is considered to be ongoing.

Stakeholders in the conflict

Sámi Parliament 
Sámi Parliament is a cultural council in strong opposition to the decision to allow mining and dumping of waste in the Repparfjord. Their concerns are primarily that of preserving the way of life of the Sámi people. More specifically, they warn of "very extensive and negative consequences for fisheries, reindeer herders and the environment". The Sámi people make their living off of reindeer husbandry and fishing, and fear that the Nussir mining operation will destroy the ecosystem needed to cultivate their livelihood. A main concern of the Sámi people is the destruction of the salmon fjord. However, it is difficult to contest because of the Norwegian government's support of Nussir ASA.

Nussir 
Nussir ASA is a mining company with financial holding in the extraction of ores. The company seeks to extract 50,000 tonnes of Copper ore annually. Nussir plans to extract the Copper through two sub-surface mining deposits located at Nussir and Ulveryggen in Reppardfjord, the homeplace of the Sámi people. Nussir ASA legally has permission to dump two million tonnes of waste into Repparfjord each year. This waste is often referred to as tailings. The waste is mostly composed of excess rock with traces of copper and nickel. Despite the large amounts of waste, Nussir claims to be the supplier of "one of the World's cleanest copper ores" and "environmentally friendly," according to their website. Nussir is supported by the Norwegian government, which boasts a 98% renewable energy grid, due to copper, which is Nussir's main export. Copper is a super-conductive metal which is powering Norway's electric-dependent future.

Environmental justice issues 
A copper mine in Artic Norway threatens to contaminate a fjord used by Sámi fishermen and disrupt Native reindeer calving areas. Nonetheless, not everyone is opposed to it. According to Nussir's environmental impact report, the mining tailings will have a "little adverse impact" on the coastal habitat. According to the report, the coagulation process will cause high concentrations of dangerous materials to accumulate around the discharge location on the bottom, affecting just a small portion of the fjord. According to Van der Meern, it would only take one unpredictable weather event, such as an inundated river or high winds, which are growing more frequent as the climate changes, to send the dangerous material to the surface, north to the Barents Sea, and beyond.

Outcome 
Environmentalists, on the other hand, claim that dumping at sea is done because it is the cheapest possible method, despite the fact that's it is damaging to the marine ecosystem. Norway is one of just four nations in the world that allows the mining sector to dump tailings in fjords, the others being Indonesia, Papua New Guinea, and Türkiye. "The mine in Kvalsund, where tens of millions of tons of waste will be dumped in the Repparfjord, will be a disaster for the fjord, the fish, and reindeer herding," says Gaute Eiterjord, director of Nature and Youth, one of the groups organized to direct actions and peaceful protests to against the mining plans. The government and the corporation do not listen to the community's right-bearers, nor do they consider reindeer pastoralism seriously. The projected negative effects will be borne by present consumers of natural resources, particularly Sámi reindeer herders and fishermen.

References

Fjords of Troms og Finnmark
Hammerfest